Al-Madina Souq is the covered souq-market located at the heart of the Syrian city of Aleppo within the walled ancient part of the city. With its long and narrow alleys, al-Madina Souq is the largest covered historic market in the world, with an approximate length of 13 kilometers. It is a major trade centre for imported luxury goods, such as raw silk from Iran, spices and dyes from India and many other products. Al-Madina Souq is also home to local products such as wool, agricultural products and soap. Most of the souqs date back to the 14th century and are named after various professions and crafts, hence the wool souq, the copper souq, and so on. Aside from trading, the souq accommodated the traders and their goods in khans (caravanserais) scattered within the souq. Other types of small market-places were called caeserias (قيساريات). Caeserias are smaller than khans in size and functioned as workshops for craftsmen. Most of the khans took their names after their function and location in the souq, and are characterized by beautiful façades and entrances with fortified wooden doors.

Al-Madina Souq is part of the Ancient City of Aleppo, a UNESCO World Heritage Site since 1986.

Many sections of the souq and other medieval buildings in the ancient city were destroyed, ruined or burnt as a result of fighting between the Syrian opposition and the Syrian Armed Forces beginning on 25 September 2012.

Souqs and khans

The city's strategic trading position attracted settlers of all races and beliefs who wished to take advantage of the commercial roads that met in Aleppo from as far as China and Mesopotamia to the east, Europe to the west, and the Fertile Crescent and Egypt to the south.

The most significant souqs within and along the covered area of Souq al-Madina:
Khan al-Qadi, one of the oldest khans in Aleppo dating back 1450.
Khan al-Burghul (or bulgur), built in 1472, hosted the British general consulate of Aleppo until the beginning of the 20th century.
Souq al-Saboun or the soap khan, built in the beginning of the 16th century. It is one of the main centres of the Aleppo soap production.
Souq Khan al-Nahhaseen or the coopery souq, built in 1539. It hosted the general consulate of Belgium during the 16th century. Nowadays, it is known for its traditional and modern shoe-trading shops with 84 stores.
Khan al-Shouneh, built in 1546. Currently functions as a market for trades and traditional handicrafts of Aleppine art.
Souq Khan al-Jumrok or the customs' khan, a textile trading centre with 55 stores. Built in 1574, Khan Al-Gumrok is considered to be the largest khan in ancient Aleppo.
Souq Khan al-Wazir, built in 1682, believed to be the main souq of cotton products in Aleppo.
Souq al-Farrayin or the fur market, is the main entrance to the souq from the south. The souq is home to 77 stores mainly specialized in furry products.
Souq al-Hiraj, traditionally was the main market of firewood and charcoal. Currently, it has 33 stores mainly dealing in rug and carpet products.
Souq al-Dira''', a large centre of tailoring and one of the most organized alleys in the souq with its 59 workshops.Souq al-Attareen or the herbals' market. Traditionally, was the main spice-selling market of Aleppo. Currently, it is functioning as a textile-selling centre with 82 stores, including a few spice-selling shops.Souq az-Zirb, originally known as Souq ad-Dharb, is the main entrance to the souq from the east. Was a place where coins were being struck during the Mamluk period. Nowadays, the souq has 71 shops, most of them deal with textiles and the basic needs of the Bedouins.Souq al-Behramiyeh, located near the Behramiyeh mosque with 52 stores trading in foodstuffs.Souq Marcopoli (derived from the family name of Marcopoli, the hereditary Italian consuls in Aleppo), a center of textile trading with 29 stores.Souq al-Atiq or the old souq, specialized in raw leather trading with 48 stores.Souq as-Siyyagh or the jewelry market, is the main centre of jewelry shops in Aleppo and Syria with 99 stores located in 2 parallel alleys.The Venetians' Khan, was home to the consul of Venice and the Venetian merchants.Souq an-Niswan or the women's market, the place where all necessary accessories, clothes and wedding equipments of the bride could be found.Souq Arslan Dada, is one of the main entrances to the walled city from the north. With 33 stores, the souq is a centre of leather and textile trading.Souq al-Haddadin, is one of the northern entrances to the old city. Located outside the main considered to be the old traditional blacksmiths' market with its 37 workshops.Souq Khan al-Harir or the silk khan, is another entrance to the old city from the north. Built in the second half of the 16th century, the khan has 43 stores mainly specialized in textile trading. It hosted the Iranian consulate until 1919.Suweiqa'' (for small souq in Arabic), consists of 2 long alleys: Sweiqat Ali and Suweiqat Hatem, located in al-Farafira district, home to a group of khans and markets mainly specialized in home and kitchen equipment.

Gallery

See also

Al-Hamidiyah Souq of Damascus

References

External links

3-D Old Aleppo map
Aleppo news and services (eAleppo)
Organization of World Heritage Cities
Ernst Herzfeld Papers, Series 5: Drawings and Maps, Records of Aleppo  Collections Search Center, S.I.R.I.S., Smithsonian Institution, Washington, D.C.
Louis Werner, 4000 Years Behind the Counters in Aleppo, 2004, Saudi Aramco World
Forbes, Andrew, and Henley, David, Aleppo's Great Bazaar (CPA Media)

Souqs
Aleppo
Historic sites in Syria
Architecture in Syria